Aboriginal land councils in the Northern Territory are representative bodies known as land councils, covering four areas of Aboriginal self-governance in the Northern Territory of Australia.

Land councils 
There are four land councils in the Northern Territory:
 the Anindilyakawa Land Council, covering Groote Eylandt in the Gulf of Carpentaria.
 the Central Land Council is in the southern half of the Northern Territory, covering  of remote, rugged and often inaccessible areas. There are 18,000 Aboriginal people from 15 different Aboriginal language groups in Central Australia.
 the Northern Land Council, covering the Top End.
 the Tiwi Land Council, covering Bathurst and Melville Islands north of Darwin.

History 
The Aboriginal Land Rights (Northern Territory) Act 1976 established the basis upon which Aboriginal people in the Northern Territory could, for the first time, claim rights to land based on traditional occupation. In effect it allowed title to be transferred for most of the Aboriginal reserve lands and the opportunity to claim other land not owned, leased or being used by someone else.

The land councils are representative bodies with statutory authority under the Act. They also have responsibilities under the Native Title Act 1993 and the Pastoral Land Act 1992.

The Northern Territory Emergency Response provided for the Commonwealth Government to compulsorily acquire five-year leases of townships currently held under the title provisions of the Native Title Act 1993, though with compensation on a basis other than just terms.

See also
Bagot Community
 Local government areas of the Northern Territory

References

Aboriginal land councils
Aboriginal organisations in the Northern Territory